Germany was the host nation and top medal recipient for the 1936 Summer Olympics in Berlin. 433 competitors, 389 men and 44 women, took part in 143 events in 22 sports.

Medalists

Gold

 Hans Woellke — Athletics, Men's Shot Put 
 Karl Hein — Athletics, Men's Hammer Throw 
 Gerhard Stöck — Athletics, Men's Javelin Throw 
 Gisela Mauermayer — Athletics, Women's Discus Throw 
 Tilly Fleischer — Athletics, Women's Javelin Throw 
 Willi Kaiser — Boxing, Men's Flyweight 
 Herbert Runge — Boxing, Men's Heavyweight
 Ernst Krebs — Canoeing, Men's K1 10,000m Kayak Singles 
 Ludwig Landen and Paul Wevers — Canoeing, Men's K2 10,000m Kayak Pairs 
 Toni Merkens — Cycling, Men's 1000m Sprint (Scratch) 
 Ernst Ihbe and Carl Lorenz — Cycling, Men's 2000m Tandem 
 Ludwig Stubbendorf — Equestrian, Three-Day Event Individual 
 Rolf Lippert, Ludwig Stubbendorf, and Konrad Freiherr von Wangenheim — Equestrian, Three-Day Event Team
 Kurt Hasse — Equestrian, Jumping Individual
 Heinz Brandt, Kurt Hasse, and Marten von Barnekow — Equestrian, Jumping Team
 Heinz Pollay — Equestrian, Dressage Individual 
 Friedrich Gerhard, Heinz Pollay, and Hermann von Oppeln-Bronikowski — Equestrian, Dressage Team
 Alfred Schwarzmann — Gymnastics, Men's All-Around Individual 
 Konrad Frey — Gymnastics, Men's Parallel Bars 
 Alfred Schwarzmann — Gymnastics, Men's Long Horse Vault 
 Konrad Frey — Gymnastics, Men's Pommeled Horse 
 Franz Beckert, Konrad Frey, Alfred Schwarzmann, Willi Stadel, Walter Steffens, and Matthias Volz — Gymnastics, Men's Team Combined Exercises 
 Anita Bärwirth, Erna Bürger, Isolde Frölian, Friedl Iby, Trudi Meyer, Paula Pöhlsen, Julie Schmitt, and Käthe Sohnemann — Gymnastics, Women's Team Combined Exercises 
 Willy Bandholz, Wilhelm Baumann, Helmut Berthold, Helmut Braselmann, Wilhelm Brinkmann, Georg Dascher, Kurt Dossin, Fritz Fromm, Hermann Hansen, Erich Herrmann, Heinrich Keimig, Hans Keiter, Alfred Klingler, Arthur Knautz, Heinz Körvers, Karl Kreutzberg, Wilhelm Müller, Günther Ortmann, Edgar Reinhardt, Fritz Spengler, Rudolf Stahl, and Hans Theilig — Handball, Men's Team Competition 
 Gotthard Handrick — Modern Pentathlon, Men's Individual Competition
 Gustav Schäfer — Rowing, Men's Single Sculls
 Willi Eichhorn and Hugo Strauß — Rowing, Men's Coxless Pairs 
 Herbert Adamski, Dieter Arend and Gerhard Gustmann — Rowing, Men's Coxed Pairs 
 Rudolf Eckstein, Martin Karl, Willi Menne, and Toni Rom — Rowing, Men's Coxless Fours
 Fritz Bauer, Ernst Gaber, Hans Maier, Paul Söllner, and Walter Volle — Rowing, Men's Coxed Fours 
 Peter Bischoff and Hans-Joachim Weise — Sailing, Men's Star 
 Cornelius van Oyen — Shooting, Men's Rapid-Fire Pistol
 Josef Manger — Weightlifting, Men's Heavyweight

Silver
 Lutz Long — Athletics, Men's Long Jump 
 Erwin Blask — Athletics, Men's Hammer Throw 
 Anni Steuer — Athletics, Women's 80m Hurdles 
 Luise Krüger — Athletics, Women's Javelin Throw 
 Michael Murach — Boxing, Men's Welterweight
 Richard Vogt — Boxing, Men's Light Heavyweight
 Helmut Cämmerer — Canoeing, Men's K1 1000m Kayak Singles
 Fritz Bondroit and Ewald Tilker — Canoeing, Men's K2 1000m Kayak Pairs 
 Erich Hanisch and Willi Horn — Canoeing, Men's F2 10,000m Folding Kayak Pairs 
 Friedrich Gerhard — Equestrian, Dressage Individual 
 Helene Mayer — Fencing, Women's Foil Individual
 Konrad Frey — Gymnastics, Men's Horizontal Bar 
 Hermann auf der Heide, Ludwig Beisiegel, Erich Cuntz, Karl Dröse, Alfred Gerdes, Werner Hamel, Harald Huffmann, Erwin Keller, Herbert Kemmer, Werner Kubitzki, Paul Mehlitz, Carl Menke, Fritz Messner, Detlef Okrent, Heinrich Peter, Heinz Raack, Carl Ruck, Hans Scherbart, Heinz Schmalix, Tito Warnholtz, Kurt Weiß, and Erich Zander — Field Hockey, Men's Team Competition
 Willi Kaidel and Joachim Pirsch — Rowing, Men's Double Sculls 
 Werner Krogmann — Sailing, Men's Monotype Class
 Heinz Hax — Shooting, Men's Rapid-Fire Pistol
 Erich Krempel — Shooting, Men's Free Pistol
 Erwin Sietas — Swimming, Men's 200m Breaststroke 
 Martha Genenger — Swimming, Women's 200m Breaststroke 
 Gisela Arendt, Ruth Halbsguth, Leni Lohmar, and Inge Schmitz — Swimming, Women's 4 × 100 m Freestyle Relay 
 Paul Klingenburg, Bernhard Baier, Fritz Gunst, Gustav Schürger, Josef Hauser, Alfred Kienzle, Hans Schulze, Helmuth Schwenn, Hans Schneider, Heinrich Krug and Fritz Stolze — Water Polo, Men's Team Competition
 Rudolf Ismayr — Weightlifting, Men's Middleweight 
 Eugen Deutsch — Weightlifting, Men's Light Heavyweight 
 Fritz Schäfer — Wrestling, Men's Greco-Roman Welterweight
 Ludwig Schweickert — Wrestling, Men's Greco-Roman Middleweight 
 Wolfgang Ehrl — Wrestling, Men's Freestyle Lightweight

Bronze
 Alfred Dompert — Athletics, Men's 3000m Steeplechase 
 Erich Borchmeyer, Erwin Gillmeister, Gerd Hornberger, and Wilhelm Leichum — Athletics, Men's 4 × 100 m Relay 
 Helmut Hamann, Rudolf Harbig, Harry Voigt, and Friedrich von Stülpnagel — Athletics, Men's 4 × 400 m Relay 
 Gerhard Stöck — Athletics, Men's Shot Put 
 Käthe Krauß — Athletics, Women's 100 metres
 Elfriede Kaun — Athletics, Women's High Jump 
 Paula Mollenhauer — Athletics, Women's Discus Throw 
 Josef Miner — Boxing, Men's Featherweight
 Xaver Hörmann — Canoeing, Men's F1 10,000m Folding Kayak Singles
 Erich Koschik — Canoeing, Men's C1 1000m Canadian Singles 
 Rudolf Karsch — Cycling, Men's 1000m Time Trial 
 Hermann Stork — Diving, Men's Platform 
 Käthe Köhler — Diving, Women's Platform 
 Otto Adam, Erwin Casmir, Julius Eisenecker, August Heim, Siegried Lerdon, and Stefan Rosenbauer — Fencing, Men's Foil Team Competition
 Erwin Casmir, Julius Eisenecker, Hans Esser, August Heim, Hans Jörger, and Richard Wahl — Fencing, Men's Sabre Team Competition
 Konrad Frey — Gymnastics, Men's All-Around Individual 
 Alfred Schwarzmann — Gymnastics, Men's Horizontal Bar 
 Alfred Schwarzmann — Gymnastics, Men's Parallel Bars 
 Matthias Volz — Gymnastics, Men's Long Horse Vault 
 Matthias Volz — Gymnastics, Men's Rings 
 Konrad Frey — Gymnastics, Men's Floor Exercises 
 Hans-Joachim Hannemann, Heinz Kaufmann, Hans Kuschke, Werner Loeckle, Wilhelm Mahlow, Helmut Radach, Alfred Rieck, Herbert Schmidt, and Gerd Völs — Rowing, Men's Eights 
 Fritz Bischoff, Hans Howaldt, Alfried Krupp von Bohlen und Halbach, Eduard Mohr, Felix Scheder-Bieschin, and Otto Wachs — Sailing, 8 Meter Class 
 Gisela Arendt — Swimming, Women's 100m Freestyle 
 Karl Jansen — Weightlifting, Men's Lightweight 
 Adolf Wagner — Weightlifting, Men's Middleweight 
 Jakob Brendel — Wrestling, Men's Greco-Roman Bantamweight 
 Kurt Hornfischer — Wrestling, Men's Greco-Roman Heavyweight 
 Johannes Herbert — Wrestling, Men's Freestyle Bantamweight 
 Erich Siebert — Wrestling, Men's Freestyle Light Heavyweight

Athletics

Basketball

First round
Winners advanced to the second round, while losers competed in the first consolation round for another chance to move on.

Second round
Winners advanced to the third round, while losers competed in the second consolation round for another chance to move on.

Second consolation round
Winners advanced to the third round.

Boxing

Canoeing

Cycling

Twelve cyclists, all men, represented Germany in 1936.

Individual road race
 Fritz Scheller
 Willi Meurer
 Fritz Ruland
 Emil Schöpflin

Team road race
 Fritz Scheller
 Willi Meurer
 Fritz Ruland
 Emil Schöpflin

Sprint
 Toni Merkens

Time trial
 Rudolf Karsch

Tandem
 Ernst Ihbe
 Carl Lorenz

Team pursuit
 Erich Arndt
 Heinz Hasselberg
 Heiner Hoffmann
 Karl Klöckner

Diving

Equestrian

Fencing

16 fencers, 13 men and 3 women, represented Germany in 1936.

Men's foil
 Erwin Casmir
 Julius Eisenecker
 August Heim

Men's team foil
 Siegfried Lerdon, August Heim, Julius Eisenecker, Erwin Casmir, Stefan Rosenbauer, Otto Adam

Men's épée
 Siegfried Lerdon
 Ernst Röthig
 Otto Schröder

Men's team épée
 Siegfried Lerdon, Sepp Uhlmann, Hans Esser, Eugen Geiwitz, Ernst Röthig, Otto Schröder

Men's sabre
 Richard Wahl
 August Heim

Men's team sabre
 Richard Wahl, Julius Eisenecker, Erwin Casmir, August Heim, Hans Esser, Hans-Georg Jörger

Women's foil
 Helene Mayer
 Hedwig Haß
 Olga Oelkers

Field hockey

Group B

Semi-finals

Gold medal match

Football

First round

Quarter-finals

Gymnastics

Handball

Preliminary round

Group A

Final round

Modern pentathlon

Three male pentathletes represented Germany in 1936, with Gotthard Handrick winning gold.

 Gotthard Handrick
 Hermann Lemp
 Herbert Bramfeld

Polo

 Group B

Rowing

Germany had 26 rowers participate in seven out of seven rowing events in 1936.
 Men's single sculls
 Gustav Schäfer

 Men's double sculls
 Willi Kaidel
 Joachim Pirsch

 Men's coxless pair
 Willi Eichhorn
 Hugo Strauß

 Men's coxed pair
 Gerhard Gustmann
 Herbert Adamski
 Dieter Arend (cox)

 Men's coxless four
 Rudolf Eckstein
 Anton Rom
 Martin Karl
 Wilhelm Menne

 Men's coxed four
 Hans Maier
 Walter Volle
 Ernst Gaber
 Paul Söllner
 Fritz Bauer (cox)

 Men's eight
 Alfred Rieck
 Helmut Radach
 Hans Kuschke
 Heinz Kaufmann
 Gerd Völs
 Werner Loeckle
 Hans-Joachim Hannemann
 Herbert Schmidt
 Wilhelm Mahlow (cox)

Sailing

Shooting

Nine shooters represented Germany in 1936. In the 25 m pistol event Cornelius van Oyen won gold and Heinrich Hax won silver.

25 m rapid fire pistol
 Cornelius van Oyen
 Heinrich Hax
 Georg Dern

50 m pistol
 Erich Krempel
 Paul Wehner
 Emil Martin

50 m rifle, prone
 Johann Schulz
 Erich Hotopf
 Arran Hoffmann

Swimming

Water polo

Weightlifting

Wrestling

Art competitions

References

External links
Official Olympic Reports
International Olympic Committee results database

Nations at the 1936 Summer Olympics
1936
Summer Olympics